The 2015–16 Hockeyettan season is the second season that the third tier of ice hockey in Sweden has been organized under that name. The regular season began on 20 September 2015 and end on 14 February 2016, to be followed by promotion and relegation playoffs.

Format
The clubs meet each team from their starting groups twice, home and away. The top four teams from each group form two new groups of eight. Teams 1–4 from Hockeyettan North and East form Allettan North, while teams 1–4 from Hockeyettan South and West form Allettan West. Each of these Allettan groups then plays an additional home-and-away series. Meanwhile, the remaining eight teams in each starting group play each other again in a continuation series.

The winner of each Allettan group qualifies directly for the 2016 HockeyAllsvenskan qualifiers. Teams 2–5 in the Allettan groups, along with teams 1–2 from the continuation groups, play a playoff to fill the remaining two spots in the HockeyAllsvenskan qualifiers. Teams 7–8 from the continuation groups are forced to re-qualify for Hockeyettan against teams from Division 2.

Participating teams

Autumn season

Hockeyettan North

Hockeyettan East

Hockeyettan West

Hockeyettan South

Spring season

Allettan North

Allettan South

Hockeyettan North (spring)

Hockeyettan East (spring)

Hockeyettan West (spring)

Hockeyettan South (spring)

Playoffs

Round 1

Tranås 2–0 Skövde

Östersund 2–1 Vännäs

Piteå 2–1 Lindlöven

Kiruna 2–0 Örnsköldsvik

Södertälje 2–0 Halmstad

Troja/Ljungby 2–0 Hammarby

Huddinge 1–2 Kristianstad

Visby/Roma 2–0 Åker/Strängnäs

Round 2

Östersund 1–2 Kristianstad

Södertälje 2–1 Piteå

Tranås AIF 0–2 Visby/Roma

Troja/Ljungby 2–0 Kiruna

Round 3

Södertälje – Kristianstad

IF Troja/Ljungby – Visby/Roma HK

HockeyAllsvenskan qualifiers

Hockeyettan qualifiers
Each qualifying group pitted the two last teams from each spring series against challengers from Division 2. The teams met in a double round-robin tournament. Only the first place team automatically qualified for play in the 2016–17 Hockeyettan season. The Swedish Ice Hockey Association then selected second and third placed teams 
from the qualifying groups for play in Hockeyettan on a geographical basis, to ensure the geographical distribution of the teams in the four groups for the following season.

North

East

West

South

References

Hockeyettan seasons
3